Bai Yan and Riccardo Ghedin were the defending champions but chose to defend their title with different partners. Bai partnered Wu Di but lost in the quarterfinals to Hans Podlipnik-Castillo and Andrei Vasilevski. Ghedin partnered Quentin Halys but lost in the first round to Bai and Wu.

Dino Marcan and Tristan-Samuel Weissborn won the title after defeating Steven de Waard and Blaž Kavčič 5–7, 6–3, [10–7] in the final.

Seeds

Draw

References
 Main Draw

Kunming Open - Men's Doubles